Tuckwell is a surname. Notable people with the surname include:

Barry Tuckwell AC, OBE (1931–2020), Australian horn player
Bertie Tuckwell (1882–1943), New Zealand cricketer
Gertrude Tuckwell (1861–1951), British trade unionist, social worker and author
Patricia Tuckwell, Countess of Harewood (1926–2018), Australian violinist and fashion model
Stephen Tuckwell GC, (1897–1966), awarded the George Cross for bomb disposal work during the Blitz
William Tuckwell (1829–1919), Victorian clergyman well known on political platforms
Zoe Tuckwell-Smith, Australian actress
Steven Tuckwell UK Politician born 1968, Hillingdon, London

Steven Tuckwell - UK politician born 1968